OBP may stand for:

 Office of Border Patrol, part of US border control
 Object-based programming
 Odorant-binding protein, olfaction; proteins
 Old Bold Pilots Association
 One Bad Pig, a Christian punk band from Austin, Texas
 On-base percentage, a baseball statistic
One Bennett Park, a skyscraper under construction in Chicago's Streeterville neighborhood
 One Bayfront Plaza, a proposed skyscraper in Downtown Miami
 OpenBoot, also known as "Open Firmware", the low-level firmware in Sun Microsystems, Inc. machines
 Orange-bellied parrot, a critically endangered bird species from Australia
 Osaka Business Park, a business district in Osaka, Japan